Biraha (sometimes known as Birha) is an ethnic Bhojpuri folk genre of Ahir communities in Uttar Pradesh, Bihar, and Jharkhand in India.  Its place in folk songs is as important as that of Dwipadi in Sanskrit, Gatha in Prakrit and Barwai in Hindi. It is composed of two episodes. When one side says their point, the other side answers in the same verse. There is no limit to the number of quantities. The volume varies with the tune of the song. It indicates the intense longing of the spouse and the pain of love or feeling of separation from him. Separation is a king, a body that does not know separation, it is a living corpse. Outside India, this genre can be found in the former colonies of where Indian indentured laborers from Uttar Pradesh, Bihar, and Jharkhand emigrated to, such as Fiji, Guyana, Mauritius, South Africa, Suriname, and Trinidad and Tobago.

History

Khari Birha 
The modern Biraha has evolved nearly 150 years ago, from its older form which is called Khari Birha (Pure Biraha). These were used to written in the form of two rhymed lines used to performed without any musical instruments.

Rām kī laṛaiyā ke nā païbe rawanawā, jekarī bagal me hanumān

Sonā kē laṃkā toharī mātī me milaīhen, tūṛ dihen toharo gumān

Ravan, you can not succeed in fighting Ram, who has Hanuman at his side

Your golden Lanka will be mixed in the soil (destroyed), your pride will be broken

Khari Biraha to Biraha 

Bihari Lal Yadav is universally recognised as the founder of Biraha. Bihari made several modifications in khari Bihari, instead of Couplet, consisting of two line he allowed unlimited numbers of rhymed lines in his Biraha. He also added a variation of Khartal as a musical instrument which became the identifying element of this genre. He introduced this genre in cities like Benaras by performing it in temples. As Biraha became a famous genre, Bihari Lal  acquired a number of "Chelas" (disciples).  These disciples later acquired their own disciples and these led to formation of several lineages which were called akhārṛā. These Akharas played a major role in organising social and performance aspects of the tradition. All the written text of Biraha were the property of that particular Akhara, so one had to take the membership of those Akharas in order to become a Biraha singer. Over the years different Akharas did some more modifications are created other variants. The three main varieties were: ṭeri, antarā and Uṛān.

Types and Structure
Biraha are mainly of two types viz. Short Biraha and Long Biraha. The short Biraha consists of two lines and called Khari Biraha. Each line is further divided in to two parts, hence the whole Biraha has four parts, that is why it is called Charkadiya (trans.: of four parts). The last word of both the lines must rhyme or the rhyme scheme should be AA. Each line should have 26 akshars (Syllable), with 16 syllables in the 1st part of each line and 10 syllables in the 2nd part of each line. However According George Abraham Grierson the 2nd part of 1st and 2nd line should have 11 and 12 syllables respectively. The last two syllables of first part of both line should be iambic (in order of 1-2) however the that of 2nd part should be in order of 2-1. In some Birahas 18 and 11 syllables are also observed in the 1st and 2nd part of the 2nd line.

Notable Biraha singers
 Bihari Lal Yadav, Father of Biraha Genre
 Baleshwar Yadav
 Heera Lal Yadav
 Dinesh Lal Yadav, Ghazipur
 ER. Sunil Yadav, Mirzapur, He is high educated Singer in Birha. Er. Sunil Yadav is completed his B. Tech in CSE, M. Tech'Goldmedalist' in Cyber Security, P. hd*(CSE) from NIT Patna. He is working as Birha Singer as well as Assistant professor and Head of department(AKTU).He had performed various stage shows across the India. He has released so many Albums from various companies. He well known for traditional folklore and Birha singing.

Notable Works

 Biraha Bahar, by Bhikhari Thakur

References

Indian folk music